Aaron Long (born March 1, 1990) is a Canadian animator and filmmaker. He is best known for his independent cartoons Sublo and Tangy Mustard and Fester Fish and for his work on the television series BoJack Horseman and Tuca & Bertie.

Long principally uses the software Adobe Flash and Adobe Photoshop to create his films. Long's work is strongly influenced by theatrical animation of the 1940s, particularly directors Bob Clampett, Tex Avery and Chuck Jones.

In 2012, he began animating the short "Bakerman and the Bunnymen" for Sonic Bunny Productions.

Since June 2013, he has resided in Los Angeles and worked at ShadowMachine directing key episodes of various TV series including TripTank, BoJack Horseman and Tuca & Bertie. In 2016, he was a key contributor to BoJack Horseman'''s "Fish Out of Water" episode.  In 2017, he directed the episode "Time's Arrow". Executive producer Lisa Hanawalt stated "This episode really changed as we were working on it, and I also will say the director of the episode, Aaron Long, is responsible for a lot of that."

In 2019, he directed three episodes of the animated series Tuca & Bertie, as well as the show's opening credits. In an interview, Long claimed "This show has been the most fun I've had in my career so far, especially directing the main title sequence."

Biography
Long is from Toronto, Ontario, Canada. He attended and graduated from Max the Mutt College of Animation, Art & Design in Toronto, where he first started making cartoons on his own using Adobe Flash. He posted his creations, starring his original character Fester Fish, on YouTube, where it was seen by companies in LA who began hiring him for freelance work while he was completing his studies. He has worked as a director, animator, character designer, and storyboarder on shows such as BoJack Horseman (Netflix), Greatest Party Story Ever (MTV) and TripTank (Comedy Central), as well as his own original projects Sublo & Tangy Mustard and Fester Fish''.

Filmography

Television

Shorts

References

External links
 
 

1990 births
Artists from Toronto
Canadian television directors
Canadian animated film directors
Living people
Film directors from Toronto
YouTube animators